Krysk  is a village in the administrative district of Gmina Naruszewo, within Płońsk County, Masovian Voivodeship, in east-central Poland. Krysk has a population of 132 (as of 2015) and an area of 0.309 km² (~0.192 miles²).

References

Villages in Płońsk County